William Oglander may refer to

Sir William Oglander, 1st Baronet (c. 1611–1670)
Sir William Oglander, 3rd Baronet (c. 1680–1734), of the Oglander baronets
Sir William Oglander, 5th Baronet (1733–1806), High Sheriff of Hampshire
Sir William Oglander, 6th Baronet (1769–1852)

See also
Oglander, surname